Lists of Chief Rabbis cover Chief Rabbis, the leaders of the Jewish community in each country. The position is often defined by the country's secular authorities, and may also apply to leaders of the Jewish community in a given city. There may be separate Ashkenazi and Sephardi Chief Rabbis, representing the two main cultural divisions of the Jewish diaspora. There is an overall worldwide list, and specialized lists.

Lists

List of Chief Rabbis by country/region, worldwide
List of Chief Rabbis of Iran
List of Chief Rabbis of the United Hebrew Congregations, United Kingdom
List of Chief Rabbis of Israel
Chief Rabbi of Jerusalem